The Night House is a 2020 supernatural psychological horror film directed by David Bruckner and written by Ben Collins and Luke Piotrowski. The film stars Rebecca Hall as a widow who discovers a dark secret about the house her recently deceased architect husband built. Other cast members are Sarah Goldberg, Evan Jonigkeit, Stacy Martin, and Vondie Curtis-Hall.

The film had its world premiere at the Sundance Film Festival on January 24, 2020, and was theatrically released in the United States on August 20, 2021, by Searchlight Pictures. It received positive reviews, with praise for Hall's performance, and was nominated for several awards, including Saturn Award for Best Horror Film.

Plot 
Beth has just lost her husband Owen to suicide. Devastated, she spends her nights drinking and going through Owen's belongings. She tries to appear stable and in control, but her friend Claire and neighbour Mel are concerned for her. Owen's ominous suicide note—"You were right. There is nothing. Nothing is after you. You're safe now."—perplexes her. She begins to suffer from strange supernatural events at night and finds a strange reversed floor plan for their house.

One night, she discovers a photo on his phone of a woman who looks similar to her, and suspects Owen was having an affair. After a night out with Claire, a drunken Beth reveals that she had been clinically dead for four minutes after a car accident years ago and saw that there was nothing when she died. Owen had always disagreed with this and was close to changing her mind before he died. Beth says that when she suffered from depression a year ago, Owen began sleepwalking, and she thought she had passed her negative emotions to him. That night, she is awakened by a supernatural presence and witnesses several frightened women fleeing through the woods and jumping into the lake. She finds blood on the boat where Owen shot himself and feels an invisible presence.

Crossing the lake to investigate a strange set of lights, she discovers a reversed copy of her house and sees ghostly figures of women with Owen. She passes out and awakens in her own house. She looks for the reversed house again and finds it, although this time it is unfinished and empty. She retrieves a strange statue from it and confronts Mel, who claims he never saw the house but once saw Owen in the woods at night with a woman who looked like Beth. Searching Owen's laptop, she finds more photos of women who look similar to her, identifies the statue from one of his books as an occult voodoo doll, and determines that Owen was trying to learn how to trick and trap demonic entities.

Beth finds the bookstore where Owen bought the books and encounters Madelyne, one of the women from Owen's photos, who denies sleeping with him. Beth visits Claire who asks her to spend a few days away from the house. She agrees and heads home to pack, where she threatens the ghost in the house. Madelyne arrives and tells Beth how Owen invited her to the reverse house. When Owen kissed her, he attempted to choke her, but apologized after she panicked and drove her back home. A drunk Beth visits the reverse house, and under the floorboards finds the bodies of the women Owen had photographed.

An invisible force caresses Beth and she hugs it, mistaking it for Owen's spirit. The spirit reveals that it is not Owen and shows her visions of Owen attacking and murdering the women. The entity drags her through the house, reveals that it is what Beth saw when she died in the car accident, and identifies itself as "Nothing". It explains that it tried to convince Owen to kill Beth to bring her back to the afterlife, but he resisted. Instead, Owen built the reverse house and murdered the Beth-lookalikes to try to trick Nothing, but Nothing realized the trick. It then traps Beth in a position like the statue that she had retrieved from the reverse house earlier.

In the morning, Claire arrives and sees evidence of a fight in the house. Discovering the gun Owen used to kill himself is gone, she rushes out to the dock with Mel, where they find Beth floating out in the boat with the gun. In Nothing's dimension, the entity tries to convince Beth to join it by killing herself, but Beth decides to put the gun down and not commit suicide. As soon as she moves the gun away from herself, Beth returns to the real world, where Claire is swimming toward the boat to save her. Once ashore, Beth sees the outline of the entity in the boat. Mel asks her what she is staring at and says, "There's nothing there," to which Beth replies, "I know".

Cast  
 Rebecca Hall as Beth Parchin
 Sarah Goldberg as Claire
 Vondie Curtis-Hall as Mel
 Evan Jonigkeit as Owen Parchin
 Stacy Martin as Madelyne

Production
In February 2019, it was announced that Rebecca Hall would star in the film, with David Bruckner directing from a screenplay by Ben Collins and Luke Piotrowski, and that David S. Goyer would produce. Principal photography began in May 2019 in Syracuse, New York.

Release
The Night House premiered at the Sundance Film Festival on January 24, 2020; and shortly thereafter, Searchlight Pictures acquired distribution rights. It was scheduled to be released on July 16, 2021, then rescheduled for August 20, 2021.

Home media
The film was released on digital platforms on October 5, 2021, with selected streaming on Amazon Prime Video. It was released on BluRay and DVD on October 19, 2021, by Walt Disney Home Entertainment. One of the bonus features of the BluRay and DVD release is a behind-the-scenes featurette, What Happens at the Lake House?.

It premiered on HBO Max on April 8, 2022.

Reception

Box office 
, The Night House has grossed $7.1 million in the United States and Canada, and $8.4 million in other territories, for a worldwide total of $15.5 million.

In the United States and Canada, The Night House was released paired with Reminiscence, PAW Patrol: The Movie, and The Protégé, and the limited release of Flag Day. It was projected to gross around $2–3 million from 2,150 theaters in its opening weekend. It made $1.1 million its first day and went on to debut to $2.9 million, finishing eighth at the box office. It fell 57% in its second weekend to $1.2 million.

Critical response 
The website's critics consensus reads, "Led by Rebecca Hall's gripping central performance, The Night House offers atmospheric horror that engages intellectually as well as emotionally." On Metacritic, another aggregator, the film has a weighted average score of 68 out of 100 based on 36 critics, indicating "generally favorable reviews." Audiences polled by CinemaScore gave the film an average grade of "C−" on an A+ to F scale, while PostTrak reported 61% of audience members gave it a positive score, with 38% saying they would definitely recommend it.

Rotten Tomatoes reported that critics found The Night House, "a thoughtful horror film that does a good job upending viewer expectations," and that it "benefits from a stunning central performance from Hall." Reviewing the film for Deadline Hollywood, Todd McCarthy praised Hall's work, saying, "The sheer intelligence and fortitude that emanate from Hall lend her struggle a measure of weight for a while as she tries to wrestle the busy demons to the ground;" though he noted that "[the] closer the film gets to having to resolve itself and make Beth's obsession pay off, the less credible and the more contrived it becomes." Similarly, David Rooney of The Hollywood Reporter praised Hall's "admirable refusal to soften the brittle edges of her recently widowed protagonist," and wrote, "There are interesting twists on the standard haunting narrative here, but the writing is too muddled to clarify them, instead veering into chaotic mayhem as Beth faces down the sinister forces that plagued her husband in a violent denouement." Clarisse Loughrey of The Independent gave the film a score of 4/5 stars, and wrote, "Whatever small contrivances or inconsistencies might dwell in The Night House's story of a husband's secrets and the home they dwell within, they melt away as soon as the camera cuts to the face of its star."

Accolades

References

External links
 
 

2020 films
2020 horror thriller films
2020s psychological horror films
2020s supernatural horror films
American horror thriller films
American psychological horror films
American supernatural horror films
British horror thriller films
British psychological horror films
British supernatural horror films
Demons in film
Films about widowhood
Films directed by David Bruckner
Films produced by Ben Collins (writer)
Films produced by David S. Goyer
Films produced by Luke Piotrowski
Films shot in New York (state)
Films with screenplays by Ben Collins (writer)
Films with screenplays by Luke Piotrowski
Searchlight Pictures films
TSG Entertainment films
2020s English-language films
2020s American films
2020s British films